Donna Marie Trow (born 13 September 1977) is a New Zealand former cricketer and cricket coach. She played as a right-arm medium bowler. She appeared in two One Day Internationals for New Zealand in 1999. She played domestic cricket for Central Districts and Northern Districts.

Trow attended the University of Waikato and received a Blues Award for cricket in 1999. She retired from cricket in 2006 and became coach of the Hawke's Bay women's team in 2007.

References

External links
 
 

1977 births
Living people
Cricketers from Napier, New Zealand
New Zealand women cricketers
New Zealand women One Day International cricketers
Central Districts Hinds cricketers
Northern Districts women cricketers
University of Waikato alumni